Kaenon is a luxury performance eyewear brand based in Newport Beach, California, United States. The company was founded in 2001 by brothers Steve and Darren Rosenberg.

References

External links 
 Kaenon.com

Eyewear brands of the United States
Sunglasses
Eyewear companies of the United States